HMS Sturdy has been the name of more than one ship of the British Royal Navy, and may refer to:

 , a tug launched in 1912, renamed HMS Swarthy in 1917, and in service until 1961
 , a destroyer launched in 1919 and wrecked in 1940
 , a submarine commissioned in 1943 and sold in 1957

Royal Navy ship names